Centrosomal protein of 55 kDa (Cep55), is a protein that in humans is encoded by the CEP55 gene.

Cep55 is a mitotic phosphoprotein that plays a key role in cytokinesis, the final stage of cell division. and cilia formation in neural stem cells.

References

External links

Further reading

Centrosome